Nina Bratchikova (born 28 June 1985) is a Russian active professional tennis player.

Bratchikova won nine singles and 35 doubles titles on the ITF Women's Circuit. On 10 December 2012, she reached her best singles ranking of world No. 79. On 10 September 2012, she peaked at No. 63 in the doubles rankings.

Tennis career

2010
In 2010, Bratchikova entered the ITF tournament in Moscow, where she won the doubles event partnering French Irena Pavlovic against Ukrainian sisters Lyudmyla Kichenok & Nadiia Kichenok.

She also won the ITF singles event in Johannesburg, beating Tamarine Tanasugarn in the final.

2012
In January, Bratchikova qualified and made it to the third round of the Australian Open main draw in which she beat Flavia Pennetta in the first round, Alberta Brianti in the second and lost to Iveta Benešová. She made her top-100 debut (No. 92) the following week.

In May, she reached to the third round of French Open, beating Monica Niculescu, Clair Feuerstein and losing against Petra Kvitova in three sets.

In November, she won the doubles title at the WTA Challenger Royal Indian Open, together with Georgian Oksana Kalashnikova.

2013
In January, Bratchikova lost in the first round of the Australian Open to Kirsten Flipkens.
Two weeks later, she reached semifinals of the Pattaya Open, winning against Shahar Pe'er, Daniela Hantuchova, Ayumi Morita and losing to Sabine Lisicki.

In July, Bratchikova lost in the first round in Budapest to world No. 71, María Teresa Torró. But in doubles with Anna Tatishvili, she reached the final and lost against Andrea Hlaváčková and Lucie Hradecká in straight sets. A week later, Bratchikova played in Båstad and defeated No. 331, Lesley Kerkhove. In the second round, she lost to world No. 76, Johanna Larsson, in two sets.

In August, Bratchikova won the first round in the qualifying of the US Open, beating world No. 201, Anne Schäfer. In the second round, she lost to world No. 166, Chanel Simmonds, by 0–6, 2–6.

WTA career finals

Doubles: 3 (3 runner-ups)

WTA 125 tournament finals

Doubles: 1 (1 title)

ITF Circuit finals

Singles: 17 (9–8)

Doubles: 61 (35–26)

Grand Slam performance timelines

Singles

Doubles

External links

 
 

1985 births
Living people
People from Zhukovsky, Moscow Oblast
Russian female tennis players
Sportspeople from Moscow Oblast
Portuguese people of Russian descent